was a court noble, general and shōgun of the early Heian period of Japan. He served as Dainagon, Minister of War and Ukon'e no Taisho (Major Captain of the Right Division of Inner Palace Guards). He held the kabane of Ōsukune and the court rank of Junior Second Rank and was awarded the Order of Second Class. He was the son of Sakanoue no Karitamaro.

Military career
Serving Emperor Kanmu, Tamuramaro was appointed shōgun and given the task of conquering the Emishi (蝦夷征伐 Emishi Seibatsu), a people native to the north of Honshū, which he subjugated. Recent evidence suggests that a migration of Emishi from northern Honshū to Hokkaidō took place sometime between the seventh and eighth centuries, perhaps as a direct result of this policy that pre-dated Tamuramaro's appointment. However, many Emishi remained in the Tōhoku region as subjects of the expanding Japanese Empire and later established independent Fushu domains. After Emperor Kanmu's death, the general continued to serve Emperor Heizei and Emperor Saga as 
He was the second person to be given the title of Sei-i Taishōgun (征夷大将軍). The first to receive this title was Ōtomo no Otomaro.
 
It is said that the famous Tanabata festivals and parades of Aomori Prefecture (also celebrated in the city of Sendai in Miyagi prefecture), which draw over 3 million people to the prefecture a year, were popularised in remembrance of Sakanoue no Tamuramaro's campaign to subdue the tribal societies then living in Tōhoku. These annual matsuri are called the Nebuta festival in Aomori City and Neputa Festival in Hirosaki City. They feature a number of gigantic, specially-constructed, illuminated paper floats.  These huge festival structures are colourfully painted with mythical figures, and teams of men carry them through the streets as crowds shout encouragement.  Aomori's great nebuta lanterns are said to hark back to Tamuramaro's innovative strategy in that early ninth century campaign.  According to legend, the taishogun is remembered for having ordered huge illuminated lanterns to be placed at the top of hills; and when the curious Emishi approached these bright lights to investigate, they were captured and subdued. Until the mid-1990s the prize awarded for the best float of the parades was called the Tamuramaro Prize.  However, there is no historical record that Tamuramaro went farther north than Iwate Prefecture.

Tamuramaro's name is linked with payments for construction projects at Kiyomizu Temple (Kiyomizu-dera) in the late 8th century.

 811 (Kōnin 2, 3rd month): Tamuramaro died at age 54, to the great regret of Emperor Saga, who expressed his sense of loss by distributing large quantities of silk cloth, cotton cloth and rice in honour of his dead counsellor. His bow, arrows, quiver and sword were placed in his coffin by order of the Emperor.

The Tomb of Sakanoue no Tamuramaro is located in Kanshuji Higashikurisunocho, Yamashina Ward, Kyoto, Japan. He is not the samurai buried at Shōgun-zuka as that was a ceremonial statue of a warrior buried by Emperor Kanmu when he decided to move the capital to Heian-kyo, present day Kyoto.

Ancestry
According to the Shoku Nihongi, an official historical record, the Sakanoue clan is descended from Emperor Ling of Han China. The Sakanoue clan's family tree shows that Tamuramaro is a 14th-generation descendant of Ling. 
Other research traces the origins of the Sakanoue clan from the Asian mainland, possibly through Baekje.

Honours
Senior second rank (May 27, 811; posthumous)

See also
 List of shōguns
 Tamura clan

Notes

References

 Bornoff, Nicholas. (2005). National Geographic Traveler Japan. Washington, D.C.: National Geographic Society.  
 Iwao, Seiichi. (2002).  Dictionnaire historique du Japon (with Teizō Iyanaga, Susumu Ishii, Shōichirō Yoshida et al.).  Paris: Maisonneuve & Larose. ;  OCLC 51096469
 Titsingh, Isaac. (1834). [Siyun-sai Rin-siyo/Hayashi Gahō (1652)], Nipon o daï itsi ran; ou, Annales des empereurs du Japon.  Paris: Oriental Translation Fund of Great Britain and Ireland.
 Varley, H. Paul, ed. (1980). [ Kitabatake Chikafusa (1359)], Jinnō Shōtōki ("A Chronicle of Gods and Sovereigns: Jinnō Shōtōki of Kitabatake Chikafusa" translated by H. Paul Varley). New York: Columbia University Press.  
 Kameda Takashi 亀田隆之 (1967). Sakanoue no Tamuramaro. Tokyo: Jinbutsu Oraisha 人物往来社.

External links 

 Shōgun-zuka – Tamuramaro's reputed grave site overlooking Kyoto is at coordinates 

758 births
811 deaths
8th-century Japanese people
9th-century Japanese people
8th-century shōguns
9th-century shōguns
Samurai
Shōguns
Bushido
Deified Japanese people
Baekje people
Japanese people of Chinese descent
Japanese people of Korean descent